Munteni may refer to several places in Romania:

Munteni, a commune in Galați County
Munteni, a village in Bulz Commune, Bihor County
Munteni, a village in Belcești Commune, Iași County
Munteni, a village in Văleni Commune, Neamț County
Munteni, a village in Mihăești Commune, Vâlcea County
Munteni-Buzău, a commune in Ialomița County
Muntenii de Jos, a commune in Vaslui County
Muntenii de Sus, a commune in Vaslui County

and to:

Munteni, a village in Lipoveni Commune, Cimișlia district, Moldova